Disability Now was a UK magazine for disabled people, published by UK disability charity Scope. It was first published in 1984 as a newspaper and continued in that form until 2008, when it was redesigned as an A4 magazine with a greater emphasis on lifestyle and features. During this time, current editor Ian Macare was hired, becoming the first disabled editor of Disability Now. In 2012 it moved to an online only format, with the last print edition in September 2012.

In December 2016, Scope announced the closure of the then-online only publication but would "continue publishing DN-branded content on its own website".

References

External links
Disability Now
Scope

Monthly magazines published in the United Kingdom
Online magazines published in the United Kingdom
Defunct magazines published in the United Kingdom
Disability publications
Magazines established in 2008
Magazines disestablished in 2012
Publications established in 1984
Online magazines with defunct print editions